New York's Funniest Reporter Show is an annual New York City based event. Featuring members of national media, each performing 5 minute sets of stand up comedy, in order to raise money for the Humane Society of New York. The end of each show is followed by the announcement of the events winners. Preparation for this event includes each reporter being assigned 1-2 professional 'comedy mentors', who help them write/learn the basic elements of the art. New York's Funniest Reporter Show is produced by Mark Goldman & Ryan McCormick.

New York's Funniest Reporter Show Participants
Media Professionals that have appeared in New York's Funniest Reporter Show have included Jane Velez-Mitchell (HLN), Courtney Friel (Fox News), Greg Mocker (WPIX), Taryn Winter Brill (Good Morning America), Lori Harfenist (The Resident), Rob Hoell (WPIX), Noelle Hancock, Cooper Lawrence (The Cooper Lawrence Show), Ellis Henican (Fox News), Robert George (New York Post), Nikki Egan (NBC), Wendy Gillette (CBS), Cat Greenleaf (NBC), Paul Messina (NY1), Roger Clark (NY1), Julia Alison (Star Magazine), Mandy Stadtmiller (New York Post), Meredith Daniels (Newsday), Marianne Schaberg (CNN), Marlaina Schiavo (CNN), Sean McCarthy (New York Daily News), Alison Rosen (Page Six), Debbie Nigro (FirstWivesWorld.com), Heather Kovar (News 12 Long Island), Peter Kramer (The Journal News), and Tiffany McElroy (WPIX).

New York's Funniest Reporter Show Emcees
New York's Funniest Reporter Show has been hosted by comedians Mark Anthony Ramirez, Ray Ellin, and Ryan Reiss. The emcee introduces all of the participants and the winner of each show.

New York's Funniest Reporter Show Judges
Previous Judges of New York's Funniest Reporter Show include: Judith Regan, Dennis Hof, George Sarris, Jeffrey Gurian, TJ Walker, Sean Mcarthy, Tasha Harris, Todd Jackson, Laurel Touby, and Emily Gould.

New York's Funniest Reporter Show Mentors
Mentors who've worked with participants at New York's Funniest Reporter Show include: Gladys Simon, Billy Bingo, Jeffrey Gurian, Eddie Brill, TJ McCormack, Geno Bisconte, Bernadette Pauley, Gina Brillon, Carole Montgomery, Jessica Kirson, and Ray Ellin

Dates, venues, and main events

References

External links
 Official New York's Funniest Reporter website
 Ann Curry ready to perform stand-up set

Live stand-up comedy shows
Charity events in the United States